Károly Szegedi (June 21, 1953 – July 25, 1978) is a Hungarian sprint canoer who competed in the mid-1970s. He won a silver medal in the C-1 10000 m at the 1975 ICF Canoe Sprint World Championships in Belgrade.

Szegedi also finished sixth in the C-1 500 m event at the 1976 Summer Olympics in Montreal.

References

Sports-Reference.com profile

1953 births
1978 deaths
Canoeists at the 1976 Summer Olympics
Hungarian male canoeists
Olympic canoeists of Hungary
ICF Canoe Sprint World Championships medalists in Canadian
20th-century Hungarian people